Napoleon: A Life is a non-fiction book authored by British historian and journalist Andrew Roberts.

References

2014 non-fiction books
Works about Napoleon
Viking Press books